Dimitar Minkov Rachkov (18 September 1972, Burgas, Bulgaria) is a Bulgarian actor and television host, including on the show Gospodari Na Efira (Lords of the Air).

Career 
He graduated from the National Academy in 1995 in the class of Prof. E. Gurova Professor Pl. Markov. He has worked in Sliven DT, DT Varna LBT "Off the Channel" and from 1998 he was in the troupe of the Ivan Vazov National Theatre, which he left in 2009. He became known for his roles in the show UFO Club (spoken "Klub NLO", in Bulgarian "Клуб НЛО"). He is currently the host of TV show "Lords of the Air" and is the voice of Uncle Brother ("Bay Bradar"), whose speech makes Bourgas image more colorful. He also starred in Full Madhouse (spoken "Pulna Ludnitsa", in Bulgarian "Пълна лудница") and presents images such as: Nicky Punchev (Nicky Kanchev) and himself in Show of Pachkov(In Bulgarian "Шоуто на Пачков") as well as characters from Sakaz "(a parody of Turkish Series "Gumus" - in English "Pearl") - Rachkur and Shmarkan, where he starred with Maria Ignatova.

Awards 
 Award-winning actor of theater festivals Blagoevgrad '99 'for the priest in "Masonry and Pop"(In Bulgarian "Зидарите и Попа").
 "Asker" 2000 for rising star man in "The Fugitive Airplane"(In Bulgarian "Самолетът беглец").

Roles

References

External links

20th-century Bulgarian male actors
Bulgarian television personalities
Bulgarian television presenters
Actors from Burgas
1972 births
Living people
21st-century Bulgarian male actors
Bulgarian male stage actors